Tudor A. Tănăsescu (2 March 1901 – 7 August 1961) was a Romanian engineer. He was born and died in Bucharest.

He was elected a corresponding member of the Romanian Academy in 1952.

Notes

1901 births
1961 deaths
Engineers from Bucharest
Corresponding members of the Romanian Academy
Members of the Romanian Academy of Sciences
20th-century Romanian engineers